Laurel station is an Amtrak station at 230 North Maple Street in the heart of downtown Laurel, Mississippi. Currently served by Amtrak's  passenger train, the station was originally built in 1913 by the New Orleans and Northeastern Railroad, which was acquired in 1916 by the Southern Railway.

The station has been listed on the National Register of Historic Places since October 31, 1995.

References

External links 

Laurel Amtrak Station (USA Rail Guide -- Train Web)

Buildings and structures in Jones County, Mississippi
Amtrak stations in Mississippi
Railway stations in the United States opened in 1913
Stations along Southern Railway lines in the United States
Railway stations on the National Register of Historic Places in Mississippi
1913 establishments in Mississippi
National Register of Historic Places in Jones County, Mississippi